Elmar Truu (also Elmar-Johannes Truu; born 19 August 1942 in Vastseliina Parish, Võru County) is an Estonian politician and sports pedagogue. He was a member of VIII Riigikogu.
In 2014, Truu succeeded Rein Randver as  Minister of the Environment.

References

Living people
1942 births
People's Union of Estonia politicians
Members of the Riigikogu, 1995–1999
Environment ministers of Estonia
People from Võru Parish
Members of the Riigikogu, 1999–2003
Members of the Riigikogu, 2003–2007